Persina Nature Park is a wetland area along the Bulgarian side of the Danube that was established on December 4, 2000. The designation of the park aims at conservation and restoration of Danube wetlands. Special attention is paid to the numerous islands and their natural status. The park is named after Persin Island, which is part of the Belene Islands Complex. Another island group is located near Nikopol. Because of its uniqueness and high importance, the island group was proclaimed a Ramsar site on September 24, 2002. At , it is the biggest such site in Bulgaria. The most significant ecosystems within the park are the flooded forests along the Danube and the inland marshes. In order to protect these habitats, several protected areas are established. A visitor centre for the park is located in Belene.

References

External links
 Official website
 Bulgaria Natural reserves | Belene - Persina Nature Park
 danubemap.eu

Belene
Nature parks in Bulgaria
Geography of Pleven Province
Tourist attractions in Pleven Province
Ramsar sites in Bulgaria
Protected areas established in 2000
2000 establishments in Bulgaria